Mato Šimunović (born 27 September 1985 in Banja Luka) is an Austrian footballer.

External links
Profile at PrvaLiga 

1985 births
Living people
Sportspeople from Banja Luka
Austrian footballers
Austrian expatriate footballers
Association football midfielders
Austrian Football Bundesliga players
Swiss Challenge League players
Cypriot First Division players
Slovak Super Liga players
FC Winterthur players
FC Nitra players
NK Domžale players
FC Wels players
Anagennisi Deryneia FC players
Expatriate footballers in Slovenia
Expatriate footballers in Slovakia
Expatriate footballers in Switzerland
Expatriate footballers in Cyprus
Austrian expatriate sportspeople in Slovenia
Austrian expatriate sportspeople in Slovakia
Austrian expatriate sportspeople in Switzerland
Austrian expatriate sportspeople in Cyprus